Umbigada (from Portuguese umbigo, "navel"),  sometimes translates as "belly bump" or "belly blow", is a dance move in various Afro-Brazilian dances. It is seen as a "basic feature of many dances imported to Brazil and Portugal from the Congo-Angola region", for example, samba, fandango, batuque, creole drum.

It is performed as follows: a dancer opens her arms and extends her navel  towards another dancer. The bodies of the two dancers may or may not touch. 

It is commonly used as an invitation to dance, e.g., during samba de roda ("samba in circle"). However it may also constitute an element of the dance itself.

References

Bibliography 
Ralph Waddey, "Viola de Samba" and "Samba de Viola" in the "Reconcavo" of Bahia (Brazil) Part II: "Samba de Viola", Latin American Music Review / Revista de Música LatinoamericanaVol. 2, No. 2 (Autumn - Winter, 1981), pp. 252-279

Afro-Brazilian culture
Dance moves
Samba